Grotteria is a comune (municipality) in the Province of Reggio Calabria in the Italian region Calabria, located about  southwest of Catanzaro and about  northeast of Reggio Calabria.

The local economy, once based on agriculture and shepherdry, has slowed due to emigration, which shrank the population from 9,242 in 1951 to about 3,380.

Grotteria borders the following municipalities: Fabrizia, Galatro, Gioiosa Ionica, Mammola, Marina di Gioiosa Ionica, Martone, San Giovanni di Gerace, Siderno.

Demographic evolution

References

Cities and towns in Calabria